Fournoulès (Languedocien: Fornolés) is a former commune in the département of Cantal in south-central France. On 1 January 2016, it was merged into the new commune Saint-Constant-Fournoulès.

Population

See also
Communes of the Cantal department

References

Former communes of Cantal
Populated places disestablished in 2016